Mehmet Nuri Conker (September 20, 1882 – January 11, 1937) was a Turkish politician and an officer of the Ottoman Army and the Turkish Army.

Mehmet Nuri Conker was the oldest childhood and lifelong friend of Mustafa Kemal (Atatürk). Mehmet Nuri Conker was a graduate of the War Academy of the Ottoman Empire (Harp Akademisi). He retired as a Colonel (Kurmay Albay). Mehmet Nuri Conker married Nedime Hanim (1890?-1969) and they had four children: Orhan Conker (1910-1975); Mahmut Cahit Conker (1912-1964); Ali Necip Conker (1914-1973); Kiymet Tesal Conker (1916-1988). His sister Dürriye Hanım married Salih Bozok. According to Philip Hendrick Stoddard, he was a brother-in-law of Süleyman Askerî Bey.
Mehmet Nuri Conker fought on numerous fronts: Libya, Manastir, the Dardanelles, the Eastern front, in Syria and in the War of Independence.  He was wounded twice: once in Boyalir and again in the Dardanelles, at Conk Bayir (the Chunuk Hill). Mustafa Kemal Ataturk gave Mehmet Nuri Conker his last name in memory of Conk Bayiri. Mehmet Nuri Conker was assigned as the Governor of Adana in 1921. He was elected to Grand National Assembly as the Representative from Kütahya (1923-1927). He was also elected to the Grand National Assembly as the Representative from Gaziantep (1932 and 1935). Mehmet Nuri Conker served as the Deputy Chairman of the Grand National Assembly during its 5th session and as Acting Chairman in 1935.
Mehmet Nuri Conker received the Medal of Independence.
Mehmet Nuri Conker knew French, German and Arabic.

Works
Conker, Mehmed Nuri, Zâbit ve Kumandan, İş Bankası Yayınları, Ankara, 1959. (He wrote this book in 1930, Mustafa Kemal's Zâbit ve Kumandan ile Hasbihal was the answer to Nuri's work.)

See also
List of high-ranking commanders of the Turkish War of Independence

Sources

External links

1882 births
1937 deaths
Politicians from Thessaloniki
People from Salonica vilayet
Macedonian Turks
Committee of Union and Progress politicians
Republican People's Party (Turkey) politicians
Liberal Republican Party (Turkey) politicians
20th-century Turkish politicians
Deputies of Kütahya
Deputies of Gaziantep
Members of the Special Organization (Ottoman Empire)
Ottoman Army officers
Turkish Army officers
Ottoman military personnel of the Italo-Turkish War
Ottoman military personnel of the Balkan Wars
Ottoman military personnel of World War I
Turkish military personnel of the Franco-Turkish War
Monastir Military High School alumni
Ottoman Military Academy alumni
Ottoman Military College alumni
Recipients of the Medal of Independence with Red Ribbon (Turkey)
Burials at Turkish State Cemetery
Governors of Adana
Military personnel from Thessaloniki